Maximilian III may refer to:

Maximilian III, Archduke of Austria (1558–1618)
Maximilian III Joseph, Elector of Bavaria (1727–1777)